Igor Omura Fraga (born September 26, 1998) is a Japanese-born Brazilian racing driver, esports player, and former member of the Red Bull Junior Team. He was the 2020 Toyota Racing Series champion, winning the title by six points ahead of Liam Lawson. He most recently competed in the 2020 FIA Formula 3 Championship with Charouz Racing System.

He has achieved success in esports as well, winning the inaugural FIA Gran Turismo Nations Cup and McLaren Shadow Project racing series in 2018. He also competed in the 2017 Formula One eSports Series but with limited success. Fraga also serves as the esports ambassador for the Super Formula Championship.

Racing career

In motorsport 
Fraga began his career through karting in 2004 at the Biwako SL Series. He won the Kids Karting class championship during consecutive years in 2004 and 2005, and continued to win the Mini ROK class championships in 2006 and 2007. Fraga would later win the 2008 Asian Karting Open Championship in the Mini ROK class the following year.

Fraga raced in Formula 3 Brasil for three years, all with Prop Car Racing. Fraga's first season in 2015 did not start well, retiring in its first three races under Class B. At the following race, he finished eighth overall, and third in class. Fraga would earn a total of two pole positions, four fastest laps, nine podiums, and four class wins in the season and would finish third in Class B with 117 points. In 2016, Fraga was promoted to Class A, but only raced in four races, those being the first event at the Velopark and the last event at Interlagos. He would finish eleventh in the Class A standings, with one podium and 19 points. Fraga would return to the newly renamed Academy class in 2017. Fraga won the class, finishing the season with 190 points, with seven pole positions, seven fastest laps, 13 podiums, and 10 class wins. Simultaneously with Formula 3 Brasil, Fraga also raced in NACAM Formula 4 Championship in 2017. In his only season in 2017–18, Fraga finished second overall and earned 286 points, with five pole positions, seven fastest laps, 12 podiums, and six race wins.

In 2018, Fraga participated in the U.S. F2000 National Championship. He ended the season in fourth overall, with three podiums and 213 points. In 2019, Fraga made his European debut in the inaugural Formula Regional European Championship, winning four races and finishing 3rd and therefore best of the non-Prema drivers.

Fraga competed in the FIA Formula 3 Championship with Charouz Racing System in 2020, partnering Roman Staněk and David Schumacher. Having only scored one point throughout the season, Fraga was set to switch to Hitech Grand Prix at the final round in Mugello, replacing Max Fewtrell, but Charouz would not authorize the move, which would place Fraga on the sidelines for the finale. He would finish the season in 24th.

In March of that year, Fraga was named as a new signing to the Red Bull Junior Team, after winning the Toyota Racing Series championship in 2020, beating out fellow Red Bull Junior Liam Lawson. He was released from the programme following the 2020 season.

At the end of 2022, Fraga partook in a Super Formula test with B-Max Racing. Fraga later took part in the post-season rookie test with Team Impul, driving Yuhi Sekiguchi's #19 car.

In esports 
In 2017, Fraga qualified for the first Formula One Esports Series final, having finished 4th and 2nd in his Heat group. His results in the final however weren't as good, finishing the three races 14th, 18th and scored six points in the last race where he finished 15th. He ended the final 18th out of 20 drivers.

Fraga has participated in the FIA-Certified Gran Turismo Championships, and made his first appearance in the series in the inaugural 2018 season, participating in the Nations Cup. On the build-up to the World Final, Igor Fraga won the Americas regional final event in Las Vegas, finishing first overall with 43 points in three races and securing a World Final spot. Fraga would take the inaugural Nations Cup championship in the World Final in Monaco with 54 points. Fraga returned to the series in 2019 for both Nations Cup and Manufacturer Series championships. A first corner spin in Red Bull Ring at the first semi-final of the World Final sent Fraga to last place and he would later be eliminated in the Nations Cup as a result, finishing 10th. He later won that year's Manufacturer Series championship for Toyota with teammates Rayan Derrouiche and Tomoaki Yamanaka. Fraga returned for the rebooted 2020 season in both competitive series. He did not qualify for the World Finals for the Nations Cup, but did finish 4th overall in the World Finals for the Manufacturer Series alongside Shohei Sugimori and Valerio Gallo.

Fraga competed in the inaugural McLaren Shadow Project in 2018 and won the series, beating runners-up Nuno Pinto and Miguel Ballester in the grand final.

In 2021, Fraga would compete in the inaugural Olympic Virtual Series, participating in the 'Motor Sport' event in the Gran Turismo Sport game. Fraga scored a 2nd-place finish in the first race, but would not be able to complete the following two races due to a network problem, which he later clarified on his Twitter.

In 2022, Fraga won the Toyota GR GT Cup championship in the Gran Turismo World Series. Fraga was also appointed as the esports ambassador for the Super Formula Championship later that year.

Personal life 
Fraga was born in Kanazawa, Ishikawa Prefecture, Japan to Brazilian parents. He previously resided in Ipatinga, Brazil, but later moved back to Japan in 2022, which he had announced on his Twitter account. Fraga is a multilinguist, capable of speaking Portuguese, English, Japanese, and Spanish.

Karting record

Karting career summary

Career summary

Career summary

Complete U.S. F2000 National Championship results

Complete Formula Regional European Championship results 
(key) (Races in bold indicate pole position; races in italics indicate fastest lap)

Complete Toyota Racing Series results 
(key) (Races in bold indicate pole position) (Races in italics indicate fastest lap)

Complete FIA Formula 3 Championship results
(key) (Races in bold indicate pole position) (Races in italics indicate fastest lap)

Notes

References

External links
 

1998 births
Living people
Brazilian racing drivers
Brazilian esports players
U.S. F2000 National Championship drivers
People from Kanazawa, Ishikawa
Sportspeople from Ishikawa Prefecture
FIA Formula 3 Championship drivers
Formula Regional European Championship drivers
Brazilian Formula Three Championship drivers
Toyota Racing Series drivers
Japanese racing drivers
M2 Competition drivers
RP Motorsport drivers
Charouz Racing System drivers
NACAM F4 Championship drivers
B-Max Racing drivers